Coryphella abei is a species of sea slug, an aeolid nudibranch, a marine gastropod mollusc in the family Coryphellidae.

Distribution
This species was originally described  near Toyama Bay, Japan in the Sea of Japan.

References

Coryphellidae
Gastropods described in 1987